Gare Saint-Jean station is located on line  of the tramway de Bordeaux. The station served as the terminus of the line until 27 February 2008 when it was expanded to Terres Neuves (Bègles).

Situation
The station is located on Charles Domercq road in Bordeaux across from Gare de Bordeaux Saint-Jean.

Junctions

SNCF (train service)
Bordeaux Saint-Jean railway station

TGV, TER Aquitaine, Trains Grandes Lignes

TBC Network
 Réseau -Bus-

Trans Gironde Network

Close by
 Gare Saint-Jean SNCF
 Parking Saint-Jean

See also
 TBC
 Tramway de Bordeaux

Bordeaux tramway stops
Tram stops in Bordeaux
Railway stations in France opened in 2004